Joe Gauci (born 4 July 2000), is an Australian professional footballer who plays as a goalkeeper for Adelaide United.

Early life
Born in Australia, Gauci is of Maltese descent and lived on New Zealand's Waiheke Island between the ages of four and eleven, playing club football for Waiheke United. As a result, Gauci is eligible for Australia, New Zealand and Malta at international level.

Playing career
In June 2018, Gauci signed a scholarship deal with A-League side Central Coast Mariners.

Following the conclusion of the 2018–19 A-League season, Gauci returned to South Australia and signed with NPL club Adelaide City for the remainder of the 2019 FFSA season. On 9 September 2019, Gauci signed a scholarship deal with Melbourne City.

In October 2020, Gauci joined Adelaide United on a scholarship deal. He made his A-League debut for the side in a 3–1 win over Melbourne Victory on 13 March 2021.

References

External links

2000 births
Living people
Australian soccer players
Association football goalkeepers
West Torrens Birkalla SC players
Central Coast Mariners FC players
Adelaide City FC players
Melbourne City FC players
Adelaide United FC players
National Premier Leagues players
A-League Men players
Soccer players from Adelaide
Australian people of Maltese descent